Pope John XVII of Alexandria (Abba Youannis XVII), 105th Pope of Alexandria & Patriarch of the See of St. Mark.

Originally from Mallawi in El-Minya in Upper Egypt, joined the Monastery of Saint Paul the Anchorite as a monk and was named Abd el-Sayed

References

John XVII of Alexandria
1745 deaths
18th-century Christian monks